Minx is a 1985 album by the British singer Toyah Willcox, released by Portrait Records. It was her first album as a solo artist and spawned the moderate hit "Don't Fall in Love (I Said)".

Background
Although still credited simply as "Toyah" (which was the name of the band she fronted up until 1984), the album was technically the start of Willcox's career as a solo artist, and her first LP for a major label, Portrait Records (part of the CBS group) after she left the independent label Safari which had released all of her music up until then. Minx was to be Toyah's only album for Portrait.

The album represented a departure from her previous works, which tended toward thematic albums written almost in their entirety by Willcox and long-standing band members such as Joel Bogen and Phil Spalding. As an attempt to make a more "polished" pop album and supposedly to break into the U.S. market, a lot of artistic control was ceded to the producers leading to an unprecedented four cover versions from the original CD's 12 tracks. The material was produced by Christopher Neil. 

The cover photograph was taken by Terence Donovan, showing Willcox wearing outfits designed by Japanese avant-garde fashion designer Issey Miyake. Miyake designed several garments for Willcox during this period, which were used as artwork in related singles. He discussed these designs in a taped interview at the time.

The lead single "Don't Fall in Love (I Said)" was a hit in the UK and Ireland, reaching the top 40, but follow-up releases "Soul Passing Through Soul" and "World in Action" were less successful. Minx debuted and peaked at number 24 in the UK and was Toyah's only entry on the pan-European albums chart (at number 81). It was particularly popular in Israel.

The album, which was out of print by the 1990s, was reissued in 2005 with bonus tracks. In 2020, it was released as part of the Toyah Solo box set and subsequently reissued on red vinyl.

Track listing

Personnel
Toyah Willcox – lead and backing vocals
Ian Wherry, Simon Darlow – keyboards
Al Hodge – guitar
Peter Van Hooke – drums
Frank Ricotti – percussion
Alan Carvell, Chris Neil, Lorna Wright, Linda Taylor – backing vocals

Guest musicians
Adrian Lee – keyboards on track 1
Andy Brown – bass on track 3 and 16
John Earle, Ray Beavis – saxophones on track 3 and 16
Michael St James – backing vocals on track 3
Richard Hewson – string arrangements on track 4 
Joji Hirota – percussion on track 5
Phil Palmer – guitar on track 6
The English Chorale – additional vocals on track 7
Paul Raven – bass on track 8
Paul Ferguson – drums on track 8
Richard Bull – guitar on tracks 9, 17 and 18
John Kirby – backing vocals on track 10
Jon McLoughlin – additional guitar on track 18

Production
Christopher Neil – producer
Simon Hurrell – engineer

Charts

References

External links
 Official audio stream on YouTube
 The official Toyah website

1985 albums
Toyah Willcox albums
Albums produced by Christopher Neil
Portrait Records albums